The Upper Harz Ponds are found mainly around the mining town of Clausthal-Zellerfeld and the nearby villages of Buntenbock and Hahnenklee in the Upper Harz mountains of central Germany. There are around 70 ponds in total, both large and small. They were built by the miners of the Upper Harz, mostly between the 16th and 18th centuries, and are important components of the cultural monument known as the Upper Harz Water Regale - a network of dams, ditches, ponds and tunnels that was built to supply much-needed water power for the mining industry in the Harz mountains. Today the Water Regale is being proposed as a UNESCO World Heritage Site. About half the dammed ponds are classified today as reservoirs, but they have now become characteristic features of the Upper Harz and are home to some extremely rare plant and animal species.

The Upper Harz Ponds also have the oldest working dams in Germany.

Purpose 

The ponds were originally built for storing the water needed to drive the water wheels providing energy to the Upper Harz silver mines. These water wheels drove the pumps, the hoisting equipment, the stamp mills and, from 1820, the man engines as well.

To begin with, the ponds merely impounded water from their natural catchment areas. But in many cases, their inflow was later increased significantly through the use of additional collection ditches.

Today the ponds are operated for several reasons: the protection of historic monuments, rural conservation, nature conservation and recreation. Several ponds also provide flood protection; others are used to supply drinking water.

The operator of the ponds today is the Harzwasserwerke, who also manage six modern dams in the Lower Saxon part of the Harz.

Design 
The barriers were built as earth-fill dams, the fill being usually excavated on site. Usually small quarries were established in the terrain earmarked as the future reservoir; this had the added advantage that it increased its eventual capacity. Neither clay nor silt could be used as grouting material because they did not occur in sufficient quantities in the Upper Harz. The Upper Harz miners had, however, learned from experience that grass sods or turves made excellent grouting; by placing them one on top of another, in a similar fashion to building a wall, a layer of sods up to a metre thick would be built into the dam which ensured that it remained watertight.

A wooden conduit (Holzgerenne) acted as a bottom outlet. It was usually made of oak due to its great durability. The valve was a so-called  Striegel, which acted like a plug and closed off the inlet to the wooden channels and was operated by rods. Both grass sod grouting and wooden bottom outlets are still in use in many of the ponds.

The dams themselves are between 4 and 15 m high and the impounded volumes varied between 10,000 and 600,000 m³. One notable exception is the Oderteich northeast of Sankt Andreasberg, which is the only pond not grouted with grass turves, but with granite sand known as granitgrus and with a dam height of 21 m and reservoir volume of  1.7 million m³ of water stands head and shoulders above the other ponds in terms of size.

Flora and fauna 

Although these water features have been artificially created, rare flora and fauna have evolved in and around many of the Upper Harz ponds. The water is low in nutrients and rather cool. The crayfish, which has died out in most European waterbodies due to crayfish plague, has been able to survive in many Upper Harz Ponds thanks to their isolated locations. Pond operators and fishing leaseholders have worked successfully to increase their numbers. 

The operation of the ponds over many centuries with constantly changing levels of water has also created a habitat for some extremely rare plant communities. On the soils of many ponds coral necklace (Ilecebrum verticillatum), strapwort (Corrigiola litoralis) or shoreweed (Littorella uniflora) may be found growing. They are dependent on this constant fluctuation of water levels in the reservoir and so the nature conservation authorities have agreed with the pond operators an operating regime that will secure the existence of these plants in the waterbodies concerned. By other ponds there are meadow bogs (Kleinseggenried), which are rich in sedges, rushes and cottongrass and moss communities.

The fish population is primarily influenced by the angling clubs that lease fishing rights and stock the ponds with fish. Only native species of fish are desired, although eel and catfish are excluded due to their incompatibility with the crayfish populations.

Table of Upper Harz Ponds 

The following list includes the majority of the dammed ponds built by the Upper Harz miners, where they are still in operation or where the dam ruins are still clearly visible. Mill ponds are not included. A total of 143 dams and former dams have been documented.

(†) means: pond out of service, largely dry. Dam remains exist.

Where no data is given, this usually indicates that the pond ended up in other hands before the mines closed and has not been precisely documented.

See also 

 Upper Harz
 Upper Harz Water Regale
 Upper Harz Water Tunnels
 Upper Harz Ditches
 List of lakes in Germany
Kunstteich

Sources 
 Friedrich, Ernst Andreas (1982): Gestaltete Naturdenkmale Niedersachsens, Landbuch-Verlag, Hannover 1982.

External links 
 Ponds around Clausthal-Zellerfeld, Buntenbock and Hahnenklee

Upper Harz Ponds
·